Deltophora lanceella is a moth of the family Gelechiidae. It is found in the West Indies (Grenada), Guyana and Brazil (Pará).

The length of the forewings is 5-5.5 mm. The forewings are grey-brown with black markings. Adults have been recorded on wing in January and February.

References

Moths described in 1979
Deltophora
Taxa named by Klaus Sattler